Carol Mireya Montaño Rocha (born 26 November 1978) is a Bolivian lawyer, politician, and trade unionist who served as a member of the Chamber of Deputies from La Paz, representing circumscription 11 from 2015 to 2020. A member of the Movement for Socialism, Montaño entered politics as head of the party's youth wing in El Alto, later serving as secretary of organization of the Federation of Neighborhood Councils. Her party's alliance with El Alto's neighborhood councils facilitated Montaño's entry into the Chamber of Deputies. In 2009, she was elected as a substitute deputy representing La Paz's circumscription 14 and in 2014, she became one of the few ruling party parliamentarians to be presented for reelection, this time for a full seat.

Early life and career 
Mireya Montaño was born on 26 November 1978 in La Paz. She studied law and political science at Central University, a private institute in the city, graduating with a master's in constitutional law and a postgraduate in conflict resolution. An early adherent of the Movement for Socialism (MAS-IPSP), Montaño entered political activity as head of the party's youth wing in El Alto. In 2006, she joined the Federation of Neighborhood Councils (FEJUVE), serving as the body's secretary of organization, charged with managing policies related to social control. Montaño's presence in both organizations represented the solid alliance the MAS had formed with the neighborhood councils, which from 2005 on, constituted one of the party's main operating arms in lower-class urban areas, playing an important role in organizing and mobilizing social sectors.

Chamber of Deputies

Elections 

In the electoral arena, the alliance between the MAS and regional neighborhood councils manifested itself in the nomination of the sector's leaders for parliamentary positions, both on the party's electoral lists and in single-member constituencies. The latter was the case for Montaño, who in 2009 was elected to the Chamber of Deputies in representation of El Alto's circumscription 14. She served as a substitute under Lucio Marca, himself a deputy with origins in El Alto's neighborhood councils.

Nearing the conclusion of her term, Montaño was presented for reelection to a full seat, an atypical occurrence within the MAS, which rarely offered its parliamentarians the opportunity to run twice in a row, preferring to open up spaces for different representatives of allied sectors to enter the legislature. She was elected to represent circumscription 11 of El Alto, the district with the largest number of registered voters in the country.

Tenure 
Despite representing such a relatively high quantity of constituents and serving as leader of the MAS's La Paz delegation, Montaño's parliamentary term kept a notably low profile, characterized by El Alteño as "working in silence." Her lack of public visibility was a situation typified by most of El Alto's elected representatives. It motivated leaders of FEJUVE to reevaluate which individuals they would nominate to represent them as MAS candidates in future elections. As such, neither Montaño nor any of El Alto's parliamentarians were presented for reelection, be it in 2019 or 2020.

Commission assignments 
 Constitution, Legislation, and Electoral System Commission (2011–2012; President: –)
 Plural Justice, Prosecutor's Office, and Legal Defense of the State Commission
 Ordinary Jurisdiction and Magistracy Council Committee (2014; Secretary: –)
 Prosecutor's Office and Legal Defense of the State Committee (–; Secretary: –)
 Human Rights Commission (2012–2013; President: –)
 Government, Defense, and Armed Forces Commission (2010–2011)

Electoral history

References

Notes

Footnotes

Bibliography

External links 
 Deputies profile (2010) Vice Presidency .
 Deputies profile (2015) Vice Presidency .
 Deputies profile Chamber of Deputies . Archived from the original on 29 June 2020.

1978 births
Living people
21st-century Bolivian lawyers
21st-century Bolivian politicians
21st-century Bolivian women politicians
Bolivian political scientists
Bolivian trade unionists
Bolivian women lawyers
Bolivian women trade unionists
Members of the Bolivian Chamber of Deputies from La Paz
Movement for Socialism (Bolivia) politicians
People from El Alto
People from La Paz
Women members of the Chamber of Deputies (Bolivia)